Italian Secondary School in Rijeka is a public high school in the city of Rijeka, Croatia. The school was established in 1888 and been in operation continuously since then. The school building is protected as a cultural heritage. Building was renovated in the period from 2006 to 2008 with support of City of Rijeka and Primorje-Gorski Kotar County.

Students of the school were among the founders of the Olimpia sport club, that has over the years, became the most successful sport organization in Rijeka.

See also
 Italians of Croatia
 Kantakuzina Katarina Branković Serbian Orthodox Secondary School
 Education in Croatia

References

Secondary schools in Croatia
Minority schools
Education in Rijeka
Educational institutions established in 1888
Italians of Croatia
Buildings and structures in Rijeka
International schools in Croatia
Organizations based in Rijeka
1888 establishments in Austria-Hungary